Public Square may refer to:

Public square or town square, an open public space in many municipalities
Public Square, Cleveland
Public Square (Watertown, New York)
Public Square Street, Kowloon, Hong Kong
"The Public Square", a poem by Wallace Stevens

See also
 Urban park
 Public Square Historic District (disambiguation)
 Digital public square
 Market Square (disambiguation)
 City square (disambiguation)
 The Square (disambiguation)
 Square (disambiguation)